Emek may refer to:

Emek (movie theater), Istanbul, Turkey
 Emek Partisi, Labour Party (Turkey)
Atila Emek (born 1947), Turkish lawyer and politician
Fikret Emek (born 1963), Turkish soldier
Emek Business Center, original name of the  Kahramanlar Business Center, Ankara, Turkey
Emek (designer) (Emek Golan), American designer, illustrator and fine art painter
Emek, a component of Hebrew placenames literally meaning "valley"

See also